William D. Emmons (November 18, 1924 – December 8, 2001) was an American chemist and published with William S. Wadsworth a modification to the  Wittig-Horner reaction using phosphonate-stabilized carbanions, now called the Horner-Wadsworth-Emmons reaction  or HWE reaction or  Horner-Wittig reaction.

Life
Emmons studied at the University of Minnesota and served in the Pacific in World War II. He avoided being drafted for the Korean War by working for the Redstone Arsenal Research of Rohm and Haas where he worked until his retirement in 1989.

Work
In work undertaken in collaboration with Arthur F. Ferris, Emmons reported that in situ generated trifluoroperacetic acid was capable of oxidising aniline to nitrobenzene, an observation which pioneered the applications of this peroxy acid as an oxidising agent in organic chemistry.  Emmons went on to discuss the preparation of trifluoroperacetic acid and numerous applications of the new reagent, including: oxidation of nitrosamines to nitramines; the Baeyer–Villiger oxidations of ketones to esters; and the conversion of alkenes to epoxides (in the presence of a buffer) or to glycols (without the buffer).

References

  

1924 births
2001 deaths
University of Minnesota alumni
20th-century American chemists
American military personnel of World War II